The 1989 season was the Minnesota Vikings' 29th in the National Football League (NFL). They finished with a 10–6 record to win the NFC Central Division. This title was secured during one of what is considered by many to be among the most exciting Monday Night Football contests ever: a Christmas Day victory over the Cincinnati Bengals at home, at the Hubert H. Humphrey Metrodome, which was the de facto first playoff game of the year. This season was also notable by how many sacks the defense produced, with 39 coming from only two players (Chris Doleman and Keith Millard) and 71 overall. Millard would later receive Defensive Player of the Year honors after putting up record numbers by a defensive tackle. The Vikings were once again embarrassed by the eventual Super Bowl champion San Francisco 49ers in the divisional round, losing 41–13.

Offseason

1989 Draft

 The Vikings traded their first-round selection (24th overall) to the Pittsburgh Steelers in exchange for LB Mike Merriweather.
 The Vikings forfeited their fifth-round selection (136th overall) after selecting defensive back Ryan Bethea in the fifth round of the 1988 NFL Supplemental Draft.
 The Vikings traded their ninth-round selection (247th overall) to the New England Patriots in exchange for New England's 1988 11th-round selection (296th overall).
 The Vikings traded their 10th-round selection (275th overall) to the Miami Dolphins in exchange for OL Greg Koch.
 The Vikings traded their 1990 11th-round selection to the Los Angeles Raiders in exchange for the 12th-round selection the Raiders received from the San Francisco 49ers.

Staff

Roster

Preseason

Regular season
The defensive line of Chris Doleman, Keith Millard, Al Noga and Henry Thomas were key contributors in helping the Vikings rank number one in the NFL in total defense. In addition, the Vikings set a franchise record with 71 sacks in one season. Chris Doleman had 21 sacks and was one shy of tying the NFL record.

Schedule

Standings

Postseason

Schedule

Herschel Walker

In 1989, at the height of his NFL career, the Cowboys traded Herschel Walker to the Minnesota Vikings for a total of five players (LB Jesse Solomon, DB Issiac Holt, RB Darrin Nelson, LB David Howard, DE Alex Stewart) and six draft picks (which led to Emmitt Smith, Russell Maryland, Kevin Smith, and Darren Woodson). This was judged to be one of the turning points in the rise of the Cowboys to the top echelon of the NFL. Walker's trade was widely perceived as an exceptionally poor move considering what the Vikings had to give up in order to get him, and remains one of the most frequently vilified roster moves of the team's history. The Vikings coaches reluctantly accepted Walker after the trade and never totally used the tool they had been given. Scout.com says, "Walker was never used properly by the coaching brain trust (a total oxymoron in this case)".

Statistics

Team leaders

League rankings

Awards and records
Keith Millard – NFL Defensive Player of the Year (AP, UPI, PFWA)
Chris Doleman – NFL sacks leader (21.0)
Randall McDaniel – NFC Pro Bowl selection

Milestones
Chris Doleman, third player in NFL history to reach 20 sacks in a season
Chris Doleman, franchise record, 21 sacks

References

External links
 Vikings on Pro-Football-Reference.com

1989
Minnesota
NFC Central championship seasons
Minnesota Vikings